The Men's omnium competition at the 2019 UCI Track Cycling World Championships was held on 2 March 2019.

Results

Scratch race
The scratch race was started at 13:16.

Tempo race
The tempo race was started at 15:33.

Elimination race
The elimination race was started at 18:17.

Points race and overall standings
The points race was started at 19:26.

References

Men's omnium
2019